Clement, (? – after 1667) was Ecumenical Patriarch of Constantinople for 42 days in 1667.

He was the metropolitan of Iconium when he was elected Patriarch on 9 September 1667. He was an uneducated and brusque person and his election was not recognised. The Holy Synod protested to Sultan Mehmet IV, who dismissed him on 21 October 1667.

Sources
Ecumenical Patriarchate 

1667
17th-century Ecumenical Patriarchs of Constantinople
Eastern Orthodox bishops of Iconium
17th-century Greek clergy